Gergely Berzeviczy berzeviczei és kakaslomniczi (Slovak: Gregor Berzevici or Gregor Berzeviczy, German: Gregor Berzeviczy) (15 June 1763 – 23 February 1822) was an important political economist in the Kingdom of Hungary, follower of Adam Smith, one of the first political economists in Hungary. He was also a successful writer and an enthusiastic propagator of the High Tatras. He was born on 15 June 1763 in Veľká Lomnica (Kakaslomnic) in the Kingdom of Hungary (now Slovakia) and died at the same place on 23 February 1822. He is renowned both in Hungary and Slovakia.

Life
He graduated from the Lyceum of Kežmarok (Késmárk) as a lawyer in 1783, then he continued his studies until 1786 at the University of Göttingen. Berzeviczy travelled round the countries, which are today called Germany, France, Belgium and England, before returning to Hungary. After returning, he settled as a state clerk, where he had to travel a lot within the country. During his inland travel experiences, Berzeviczy wrote many reform ideas to the king, Joseph II about boosting the economy of Hungary, but they were inefficient. In 1795, Berzeviczy took a minor part in the jacobinist Martinovics-plot against the new emperor Francis I, named after its leader, Ignác Martinovics. After its failure, Berzeviczy retired from active work, and turned to science, especially to economics and ethnography, and writing. He was one of the first economists in Hungary to realize that the feudal liaisons were heavily blocking the country's economical advancing possibilities.  He also criticized the exploitation of the peasants by the nobles, using a very sharp tone.

De commercio et industria Hungariae was the first book in Hungary, which showed the elements of Adam Smith's theories. In his book De conditione et indole rusticorum in Hungaria Berzeviczy compared the peasants of Europe by countries, being the first one to do it in Hungary.  Berzeviczy's ethnographycal and economical researches and publications earned him a place in the Company of Scholars in Göttingen, in 1802.

He contributed in Latin and German only.

Important works
 De commercio et industria Hungariae (Lőcse, 1797)
 De conditione et indole rusticorum in Hungaria (Lőcse, 1806)
 Notizen über das Zipser Komitat in Ungarn Vaterländer Blätter (1810) 
 Oeconomica Publico Politica etc. (1818, first printed in Budapest in 1902) 
 Die Karpathen in Ungern, ihre natürliche Beschaffenheit, ihre naturerscheinungen, ihre Seen un Thäler, Thiere, Pflanzen und Mineralien, in Sartori Franz: Oesterreichs Tibur (Vienna, 1819) 
 Die merkwürdigen Karpathen in Ungarn in Sartori Franz: Naturwunder und ausserordenliche Naturerscheinungen unserer Zeit in dem österr. Kaiserthum  (Graz, 1821)

Memorials
 The Gergely Berzeviczy Secondary School in Miskolc, Hungary was named after him.

Sources
church.lutheran.hu (in Hungarian)
 short bio in the Hungarian Ethnographical Lexicon (Hungarian)

Bibliography 
 Gyula Ortutay: Berzeviczy Gergely (Írók, népek, századok, Budapest, 1960)
 Róbert Horváth: Berzeviczy Gergely közgazdasági és népességi tanai (Szeged, 1964)
 Éva H. Balázs: Berzeviczy Gergely a reformpolitikus (Budapest, 1967)

1763 births
1822 deaths
People from Kežmarok District
Hungarian economists
Gergely
Hungarian nobility